Wendy Sharpe (born 25 June 1963) is an association football player who represented New Zealand at international level. Sharpe is New Zealand's leading women's international goalscorer.

Sharpe made her full Football Ferns debut in a 3–3 draw with Australia 18 May 1980 and finished her international career with 51 caps and 29 goals to her credit, her last cap being in a 0–2 loss to Australia on 19 March 1995.

References

1963 births
Living people
New Zealand women's international footballers
New Zealand women's association footballers
Women's association football forwards